The Roman Catholic Diocese of Anse-à-Veau and Miragoâne is a diocese located in the Nippes, Haiti. It is part of the Ecclesiastical province of Port-au-Prince.

History
On 13 July 2008 Pope Benedict XVI established the Diocese of Anse-à-Veau et Miragoâne from the Diocese of Les Cayes.

Ordinaries
Pierre-André Dumas (July 13, 2008 – present)

Notable churches
Cathedral of Saint Anne in Anse-à-Veau
Co-Cathedral of Saint John the Baptist in Miragoâne

References

Roman Catholic dioceses in Haiti
Anse-à-Veau and Miragoâne
Anse-à-Veau and Miragoâne
2008 establishments in Haiti
Nippes
Roman Catholic Ecclesiastical Province of Port-au-Prince